So Chae-won (born 12 November 1997) is a South Korean compound archer.

In 2017, she won gold medals in the individual event and in the Mixed team event alongside Kim Jong-ho and a bronze medal in the Women's team event alongside Kim Yun-hee and Song Yun-soo at the Summer Universiade games. She also won a bronze medal at the 2017 World Archery Championships in the women's team event alongside Choi Bo-min and Song Yun-soo.

She participated in the 2018 Asian Games winning a gold medal in the women's team event alongside Choi Bo-min and Song Yun-soo and a silver medal in the mixed team event alongside Kim Jong-ho. She also won a bronze medal at the 2018 Archery World Cup final in the individual event.

References

1997 births
Living people
South Korean female archers
Asian Games medalists in archery
Archers at the 2018 Asian Games
Medalists at the 2018 Asian Games
Asian Games gold medalists for South Korea
Asian Games silver medalists for South Korea
World Archery Championships medalists
Universiade medalists in archery
Universiade gold medalists for South Korea
Universiade bronze medalists for South Korea
Medalists at the 2017 Summer Universiade
Medalists at the 2019 Summer Universiade
21st-century South Korean women